"The Beach of Falesá" is a novella by Scottish author Robert Louis Stevenson. It was first published in the Illustrated London News in 1892, and later published in book form in the short-story collection Island Nights' Entertainments (1893). It was written after Stevenson moved to the South Seas island of Samoa just a few years before he died there.

Plot
John Wiltshire, a Scottish copra trader on the fictional South Sea island of Falesá. Upon arriving on the island, he meets a rival trader named Case, who (in an apparently friendly gesture) arranges for him to be "married" to a local girl named Uma in a ceremony designed to impress the natives but to be completely non-binding in the view of Europeans.

Wiltshire soon discovers that Uma has a taboo attached to her which causes all the other natives to refuse to do business with him, to Case's profit. He also hears rumours of Case having been involved in the suspicious deaths of his previous competitors. Although realising that he has been tricked, Wiltshire has genuinely fallen in love with Uma, and has their marriage legalised by a passing missionary.

Wiltshire gradually learns that Case's influence over the villagers stems from their belief that he has demonic powers, as a result of his simple conjuring tricks as well as strange noises and visions they have experienced at a "temple" he has built in the forest. Upon investigating, Wiltshire finds that these experiences are also tricks produced by imported technologies such as luminous paint and Aeolian harps.

Wiltshire sets out that night to destroy the temple with gunpowder. Case confronts him and the two men fight, resulting in Case's death.

The story concludes with Wiltshire several years later living on another island, still happily married to Uma, worrying about what will happen to his mixed-race children.

Analysis 

Stevenson saw "The Beach of Falesá" as the ground-breaking work in his turn away from romance to realism. Stevenson wrote to his friend Sidney Colvin:

In an unusual change for Stevenson, but in line with realism, the plot of the story is less important, rather the realistic portrayal of the manners of various social classes in island society is foregrounded; it is essentially a novel of manners. As Stevenson says to Colvin in a letter, "The Beach of Falesá" is "well fed with facts" and "true to the manners' of the society it depicts." Other than the island itself which is fictional, it contains the names of real people, real ships and real buildings which Stevenson was familiar with from his personal travels in the South Seas.

Of further interest regarding the analysis of this text is its publication history. Censored by its publisher, The Beach of Falesá directly addresses British colonialism while confronting the taboos regarding miscegenation.  A comparison of earlier printed editions to Steven's original draft has been a source of fairly recent scholarly inquiry.  In a somewhat similar vein, another provocative approach to Stevenson's South Seas writings has been taken through the lens of ethnography.

In 1956, The Heritage Press of New York published a full version stating "the text (of the 1892 serialization) was bowdlerized, and the present printing represents the story exactly as R.L.S. wrote it."

Reception 

"The Beach of Falesá", along with his two other South Seas tales in Island Nights' Entertainments, were generally poorly received by his peers in London. Stevenson was known and loved for his historical romances such as Treasure Island, Kidnapped and The Master of Ballantrae and so his shift to realism was not widely applauded. Oscar Wilde complained "I see that romantic surroundings [Samoa] are the worst surroundings possible for a romantic writer. In Gower Street Stevenson could have written a new Trois Mousquetaires. In Samoa he wrote letters to The Times about Germans." Edmund Gosse wrote "The fact seems to be that it is very nice to live in Samoa, but not healthy to write there."

Screenplays based on the novella were written by Dylan Thomas and Alan Sharp but never produced. Adding a narrator's voice, BBC Radio 3 broadcast Thomas's screenplay in May 2014.

While its title was unnamed, the book was referenced importantly in the plotting of Georges Simenon's 1930 The Late Monsieur Gallet.

Notes

External links
Full text available at Wikisource

Short stories by Robert Louis Stevenson
1892 short stories
Works originally published in The Illustrated London News
Novels set in Oceania